Breaker is the third studio album by the Boston alternative rock band Vary Lumar. Experiencing a lull in morale following the exit of original guitarist Ben Case, the band found themselves revitalized after a string of singles and performances with new member Christopher G. Brown. Working again with longtime producer Sean McLaughlin at 37' Productions, the band spent much of the Summer of 2014 tracking the album. A successful Kickstarter campaign enabled the album to be released on vinyl.

Breaker was released to local acclaim, with The Boston Herald, The Noise, and DigBoston all praising the energy and composition of the album.

Track listing

Personnel
Vary Lumar
 Paul DePasquale: lead vocals, guitars, keyboards, programming
 Christopher G. Brown: guitars, keyboards, programming
 Robert Laff: bass guitar, baritone guitar, keyboards, organ
 Ron Fusco: drums, percussion

Additional personnel
 Sean McLaughlin: recording engineer, mixer, producer
 Jeff Lipton: mastering
 Maria Rice: mastering assistant
 Executive Producer: Nikki DePasquale, Music and Motion Studios LLC
 Executive Producer: Dan Ameen
 Photography by Divided by Xero
 Packaging design by Chimmy and Flap

References

2014 albums
Kickstarter-funded albums
Vary Lumar albums